Union councils of Bagerhat District are the smallest rural administrative and local government units in Satkhira District of Bangladesh. The district consists of 2 municipalities, 9 upazilas, 79 union porishods and 1047 villages.

Bagerhat Sadar Upazila
Bagerhat Sadar has 10 Wards/Unions, 187 Mauzas/Mahallas, and 167 villages.
 Karapara Union
 Bamorta Union
 Gotapara Union
 Bishnapur Union
 Baruipara Union
 Jatrapur Union
 Satgambuj Union
 Khanpur Union
 Rakhalgachi Union
 Dema Union

Fakirhat Upazila
Fakirhat has 8 Unions/24Wards, 67 Mauzas/Mahallas, and 87 villages.
 Betaga Union
 Lakhpur Union
 Piljang Union
 Fakirhat Union
 Bahirdia Mansa Union
 Naldha Mauvhog Union
 Mulghar Union
 Suvhadia Union

Mollahat Upazila
Mollahat Thana was established in 1967 and was turned into an upazila in 1983. It consists of 7 union parishads, 58 mouzas and 102 villages.
 Udoypur Union
 Chunkhola Union
 Gangni Union
 Kulia Union
 Gaola Union
 Kodalia Union
 Atjuri Union

Kachua Upazila
Kachua has 7 Unions/Wards, 78 Mauzas/Mahallas, and 96 villages.
 Gojalia Union
 Dhopakhali Union
 Moghia Union
 Kachua Union
 Gopalpur Union
 Raripara Union
 Badhal Union

Chitalmari Upazila
Chitalmari thana was turned into an upazila in 1983. Chitalmari has 7 unions/wards, 58 mouzas/mahallas, and 121 villages.
|list5 =
 Barobaria Union
 Kalatala Union
 Hizla Union
 Shibpur Union
 Chitalmari Union
 Charbaniari Union
 Shantoshpur Union

Morrelganj Upazila
Morrelganj Upazila has 16 unions, 1 municipality, 122 Mauzas/Mahallas, and 184 villages.
 Teligati Union
 Panchakaran Union
 Putikhali Union
 Daibagnyahati Union
 Ramchandrapur Union
 Chingrakhali Union
 Hoglapasha Union
 Banagram Union
 Balaibunia Union
 Hoglabunia Union
 Baharbunia Union
 Jiudhara Union
 Nishanbaria Union
 Baraikhali Union
 Morrelganj Union
 Khaulia Union

Rampal Upazila
Rampal has 11 Unions/Wards, 140 Mauzas/Mahallas, and 149 villages.
 Gouramva Union
 Uzalkur Union
 Baintala Union
 Rampal Union
 Rajnagar Union
 Hurka Union
 Perikhali Union
 Vojpatia Union
 Mollikerber Union
 Banshtoli Union

Mongla Upazila
Mongla thana was established in 1976 and was turned into an upazila in 1983. It consists of 1 municipality 7 union parishads, 37 mouzas and 77 villages.
 Burirdanga Union
 Mithakhali Union
 Sonailtala Union
 Chandpai Union
 Chila Union
 Sundarban Union

Sarankhola Upazila
Sarankhola has 4 Unions/Wards, 11 Mauzas/Mahallas, and 44 villages.
 Dhansagor Union
 Khontakata Union
 Rayenda Union
 Southkhali Union

References 

Local government in Bangladesh